Relax is a 2005 Indian Telugu-language social thriller film directed by Pradeep C Shetty and starring newcomer Rohan and Daisy Bopanna (credited as Anjali) Critics praised the film's intention, but they criticised the execution.

Cast 
Rohan as Sandeep
Daisy Bopanna as Anjali
Vijayachander as Sharma
Brahmanandam as a security guard
Ali as Ram Nepal Varma
M. S. Narayana as a drunkard
Jayaprakash Reddy as a police officer

Soundtrack 
The music was composed by Ramana Gogula. Pawan Kalyan attended the film's audio launch.

Reception 
Jeevi of Idlebrain.com opined that "The producers should be appreciated for selecting a novel storyline. But substandard execution marred the prospects of the film". B. Anuradha of Rediff.com wrote that "Debutant director Pradeep Shetty's offbeat film included a rare mix of comedy with astrology. It is based on a 'different' story amid routine romantic Telugu movies, and the makers should be lauded for betting on such a concept". Ravi Kalaga of Full Hyderabad said that "Relax combines astrology with modern philosophy to weave a tale astutely as to how someone with an in-depth knowledge of prediction can change the destinies of many. But unfortunately, the producers and the director forgot to predict their own destinies after this blunder".

References

External links